ColorCode 3-D is an anaglyph 3D stereoscopic viewing system deployed in the 2000s that uses amber and blue filters. It is intended to provide the perception of nearly full colour viewing with existing television, digital and print mediums. Danish company ColorCode 3-D ApS distributes the system.

Technology
One eye (left, amber filter) receives the cross-spectrum colour information and one eye (right, blue filter) sees a monochrome image designed to give the depth effect. The human brain ties both images together.

Images viewed without filters will tend to exhibit light-blue and yellow horizontal fringing. The backwards compatible 2D viewing experience for viewers not wearing glasses is improved, generally being better than previous red and green anaglyph imaging systems, and further improved by the use of digital post-processing to minimise fringing. The displayed hues and intensity can be subtly adjusted to further improve the perceived 2D image, with problems only generally found in the case of extreme blue.

The blue filter is centred on 450 nm and the amber filter lets in light at wavelengths at above 500 nm. Wide spectrum colour is possible because the amber filter lets through light across most wavelengths in spectrum.

Notable uses 

The technology premiered with a ColorCode 3-D release of nWave Pictures' Encounter in the Third Dimension, which was the first of a series of ColorCode 3-D releases distributed to IMAX theaters worldwide. In the United Kingdom, television station Channel 4 commenced broadcasting a series of programmes encoded using the system during the week of 16 November 2009. Previously the system had been used in the United States for an "all 3-D advertisement" during the 2009 Super Bowl on NBC for SoBe, the animated film Monsters vs. Aliens, and an advertisement for the television series Chuck in which the full episode the following night used the format.

In print, Time Inc. used ColorCode 3-D in five of their magazines (Time, People, Sports Illustrated, Entertainment Weekly, and Fortune) to display 3-D images when they published a series of articles about the new "3-D revolution" in April 2009.

Viewing comfort 
ColorCode 3-D, like all stereoscopic 3D technologies, does reduce the overall brightness of the viewed image. Also, improperly calibrated displays can cause image ghosting.

References

External links 

  describing the technology

3D imaging